Ali Bandu-ye Olya (also Romanized as ʿAlī Bandū-ye ‘Olyā) is a village in Chahar Gonbad Rural District, in the Central District of Sirjan County, Kerman Province, Iran. At the 2006 census, its population was 35, in 7 families.

References 

Populated places in Sirjan County